White Line (2003) is an album by Memorain.

Track listing
All songs written by Ilias Papadakis, except "High Treason", written by Ilias Papadakis, Kostas Bagiatis and Panos Andricopoulos.

"The Real World"
"Buried In Lies"
"Condemn Me To Obscurity"
"Inside My Mind"
"White Line"
"Silent Cry"
"High Treason"
"My Choice"

Credits
 Ilias Papadakis     - Guitars, Vocals  
 Kostas Bagiatis - Bass  
 Panos Andricopoulos    - Drums

Guests
 James Murphy - Solos on tracks 2,4,5,6,7

References

2003 albums
Memorain albums